Sipuikawn is a village in Churachandpur District, Manipur, India. It is located in south-western hilly region of Manipur bordering the Indian state of Mizoram. Parbung is the Sub-Divisional block headquarters. Nearby villages are Lungthulien, Rawvakawt and Khawpuar (Mizoram).

Geography
The latitude of Sipuikawn, Manipur, India is 24.2144° or 24° 12' 51.8" north
and the longitude is 93.0364° or 93° 2' 10.9" east

Churches
 The Salvation Army (TSA)
 Independence Church of India (ICI)
 Evangelical Free Church of India (EFCI)
 Evangelical Assembly Church (EAC)
 Reformed Presbyterian Church (RPC)

References

Villages in Churachandpur district